This is a list of numbered county roads in Grey County, Ontario.

References

Grey